This is a summary of 1911 in music in the United Kingdom.

Events
24 May – Edward Elgar conducts the première of his second symphony in front of a smaller-than-expected audience at the Queen's Hall, London.
June – Edward Elgar is appointed to the Order of Merit by King George V
22 June – At the Coronation of King George V and Queen Mary, Sir Frederick Bridge, as Director of Music, seeks to cover four hundred years of British music, Works by Thomas Tallis, John Merbecke and George Frederick Handel are included, alongside new works by Sir Hubert Parry (a new orchestral introduction for his setting of Psalm 122, "I was glad" and a new setting of the Te Deum), Charles Villiers Stanford (a new setting of the Gloria), Elgar (Coronation March), organist Walter Alcock (a new setting of the Sanctus), and Bridge himself.   
July – Frank Bridge completes his orchestral suite The Sea, during a visit to the seaside town of Eastbourne.
October - The Society of Women Musicians, co-founded by Gertrude Eaton, Marion Scott, Katharine Eggar, and others, holds its first meeting.
23 November – Elgar's Symphony no 2, again conducted by the composer, is performed by the Hallé Orchestra, and receives mixed reviews.

Popular music
Harry Lauder - "Roamin' In The Gloamin'"
Billy Merson
"The Photo of the Girl I Left Behind"
"The Spaniard That Blighted My Life"

Classical music: new works
George Butterworth – Two English Idylls
Eric Coates – Miniature Suite
Frederick Delius 
A Song of the High Hills
Summer Night on the River
Gustav Holst – Second Suite in F, for military band
Roger Quilter – Where the Rainbow Ends (incidental music for the play)
Ethel Smyth – The March of the Women
Charles Villiers Stanford
Symphony No. 7 in D minor, Op. 124
Piano Concerto No. 2 in C minor, Op. 126

Opera
The Count of Luxembourg, based on the music of Franz Lehár's German operetta Der Graf von Luxemburg (1909), with English lyrics and libretto by Basil Hood and Adrian Ross.

Musical theatre
4 March – Peggy, with music by Leslie Stuart, book by George Grossmith, Jr., and lyrics by C. H. Bovill, starring Edmund Payne, Phyllis Dare and Gabrielle Ray, opens at the Gaiety Theatre, London, where it will run for 270 performances.

Births
24 January 
Evelyn Barbirolli, oboist (died 2008)
Muir Mathieson, conductor and composer (died 1975)
9 June – Frederick May, Irish composer (died 1985)
27 August – Kay Walsh, dancer and actress (d. 2005)
25 December – Eric Gilder, musicologist (died 2000)
27 December – Anna Russell, singer and comedian (died 2006)
28 December – Max Jaffa, violinist and bandleader (died 1991)
date unknown - Gladys Midgley (née Vernon), pianist and singer (died 2005)

Deaths
4 May – Ronald Richardson Potter, organist and composer, 31 
29 May – W. S. Gilbert, lyricist (Savoy operas), 74
13 June – Patrick Heeney, Irish composer, 29
29 August – Hildegard Werner, Swedish-born musical conductor, 77
13 October – Harry Rickards, English-born baritone, comedian and theatre owner, 67 (apoplexy)

See also
 1919 in the United Kingdom

References

British Music, 1911 in
Music
British music by year
1910s in British music